Adisak Sensom-Eiad, simply known as Max, is a Thai professional footballer.

Honours

Club
Buriram United
 Thai League Cup (1):  2016

External links
 

1994 births
Living people
Adisak Sensom-Eiad
Adisak Sensom-Eiad
Association football fullbacks
Adisak Sensom-Eiad
Adisak Sensom-Eiad
Adisak Sensom-Eiad
Adisak Sensom-Eiad
Adisak Sensom-Eiad
Adisak Sensom-Eiad
Nakhon Si United F.C. players